Blera robusta, the Greenish Wood Fly, is a rare species of syrphid fly first officially described by Curran in 1922. Hoverflies get this name from the ability to remain nearly motionless while in flight. The adults are also known as flower flies, for they are commonly found around and on the flowers from which they get both energy-giving nectar and protein rich pollen. The larvae are of the rat-tailed type, feeding on exuding sap or in the rot holes of trees.

Distribution
This is a Nearctic species located in the Northwestern United States and in Southwestern Canada.
 External map

Description
For terms see Morphology of Diptera.
External images of Blera robusta 
Size 11 mm.
Head
The front is shining black with black pile. The sides are somewhat narrowed above. The face is mostly glossy brownish black but with an area of yellow  immediately below the antennae and at the sides. The gena is black with yellow pile. The face is thinly covered with silvery pollen. The side  margins of the face covered sparsely with whitish pile. In profile the sub-keel-shaped face is slightly  produced below the middle, indicating a long brown and black pilose tubercle. The pile under the eyes is yellowish. The antennae are black with a reddish brown circular flagellum. The arista is black.  The frontal prominence is narrowly reddish apically. The pile, on the  lower half of the occiput is brown on the lower half and black on the upper half, with areas of grayish white pollen.
Thorax
The dorsum of  the thorax (scutum) is shining blue-black and thickly clothed with long, pale yellow pile. The scutellum  is shining black and covered with moderately long pale yellow pile.  The pleurae margined with reddish  except below. The sides are bare except on the meso and sternopleura that are covered with long yellow pile.

Abdomen
The abdomen  is black pilose except the immediate basal corners which bear yellow pile and wholly shining black, with a strong purplish reflection, The first two ventral segments are yellow apically at the sides. 
Wing  
The wings are moderately brownish, less so outwardly, with conspicuously yellow bases. The stigma stigma is faintly brownish. The calypters and fringe are whitish yellow. The halteres (#9) are yellow.   The  vein R4+5 is almost straight and joins the costa just before the tip of the wing. The first posterior cell r4+5 is acute apically and  extends almost to the wing margin before the tip.
Legs
The legs are blackish covered in short black pile, some what longer on the femora. The femora are tipped with yellow. The bases and ends of the tibiae are yellow as are the first three joints of the anterior four and second and third of the hind tarsi .

References

Eristalinae
Insects described in 1922
Diptera of North America

Hoverflies of North America
Taxa named by Charles Howard Curran